Gerald Myers coached the Texas Tech Red Raiders basketball teams from 1971 to 1991, before stepping down to become the athletic director for the Texas Tech Red Raiders. In Myers' twenty seasons at Texas Tech, he compiled a 326–261 record.  Under Myers, the Red Raiders won two conference championships and earned four trips to the NCAA tournament and one to the NIT tournament.

1970–71

Source:

1971–72

Source:

1972–73

1973–74

Source:

1974–75

Source:

1975–76

1976–77

Source:

1977–78

Source:

1978–79

1979–80

Source:

1980–81

Source:

1981–82

Source:

1982–83

Source:

1983–84

Source:

1984–85

1985–86

1986–87

Source:

1987–88

Source:

1988–89

Source:

1989–90

Source:

1990–91

Source:

References

Texas Tech Red Raiders basketball seasons